Huang Shan-shan is a Taiwanese politician and lawyer. 

Huang began her political career as a New Party member of the Taipei City Council in 1998. She left the New Party in 2001, and since 2002, has been a member of the People First Party. In October 2019, she was appointed a deputy mayor of Taipei. Huang's resignation from the deputy mayorship took effect on 28 August 2022, and she is running for mayor of Taipei as a political independent.

References

1959 births
Living people
Politicians of the Republic of China on Taiwan from Hsinchu
21st-century Taiwanese women politicians
People First Party (Taiwan) politicians
National Taiwan University alumni
Taiwanese women lawyers
Deputy mayors of Taipei
New Party (Taiwan) politicians
20th-century Taiwanese women politicians
Taipei City Councilors
21st-century Taiwanese politicians
20th-century Taiwanese politicians
Women local politicians in Taiwan